R class or Class R may refer to:

Locomotives
LCDR R class, a British steam locomotive class
NER Class R, a British steam locomotive class
NZR R class, a type of New Zealand steam locomotive
Rhymney Railway R class, class of tank locomotive
Victorian Railways R class, Australian steam locomotive

Ships

Surface vessels
R-class cruise ship, a cruise ship design
R-class destroyer (1916), a series of World War I Royal Navy destroyers
Q and R-class destroyer, Royal Navy ships launched during World War II
R-class patrol boat, Finnish patrol boats
Revenge-class battleship, of the Royal Navy

Submarines
British R-class submarine, a Royal Navy World War I submarine
Italian R-class submarine, a large World War II Italian submarine
Rainbow-class submarine, a Royal Navy  World War II submarine 
United States R-class submarine, a type of US Navy submarine

Other uses
Mercedes-Benz R-Class, an automobile

See also
 Model R (disambiguation)
 Type R (disambiguation)
 R (disambiguation)